Riccardo Colombo (born 1 December 1982) is an Italian former footballer who played as a defender.

Club career
In the 2008–09 season, Colombo played three games in the 2008–09 Coppa Italia.

During the 2009–10 season, ultras of Torino attacked the players during David Di Michele's birthday party. After the incident the players involved: Di Michele, Massimo Loviso, Riccardo Colombo, Aimo Diana, Marco Pisano, Francesco Pratali, Paolo Zanetti were transferred to other clubs and only Rolando Bianchi, Matteo Rubin and Angelo Ogbonna were remained.

On 26 November 2016, Colombo returned to Pro Patria. After five seasons with the club, on 27 June 2021 Colombo announced his retirement. Colombo returned to playing for one more season to play in the 2021–22 Serie C, before retiring for good.

References

External links
Profile at gazzetta.it 

1982 births
Living people
Sportspeople from Varese
Footballers from Lombardy
Italian footballers
Association football defenders
Serie A players
Serie B players
Serie C players
Serie D players
Aurora Pro Patria 1919 players
U.C. AlbinoLeffe players
Udinese Calcio players
Torino F.C. players
U.S. Triestina Calcio 1918 players
Reggina 1914 players
Novara F.C. players
A.S. Cittadella players
U.S. Salernitana 1919 players